Donald Piers Chesworth (1923–1991) OBE was a politician and administrator who was closely associated with labour causes. His papers are held by Queen Mary Archives. He was warden of Toynbee Hall from 1977 to 1987. Michael Meadowcroft described him as a “fine political fixer”.

Selected appointments
His appointments included:
 Student and Overseas Secretary, International Union of Socialist Youth, 1947-1951
 Chairman, National Association of Labour Student Organisations, 1947
 Whip and Member of the Policy Committee, London County Council, 1952-1965
 Member, Board of Visitors, Hewell Grange Borstal, 1950-1952
 Chairman, Managers of Mayford Home Office Approved School, 1952-1958
 Labour Adviser, Tanganyika Government and Chairman, Territorial Minimum Wages Board, 1961-1962
 Labour Adviser, Mauritius Government and Chairman, Sugar Wages Councils, 1962-1965
 Council member, 1965-1976 and Chairman, 1967, 1968, 1970–1974, War on Want
 Director, Notting Hill Social Council, 1968-1977
 National Committee, UK Freedom from Hunger Campaigns, 1969-1976
 Executive Board, Voluntary Committee on Overseas Aid and Development, 1969-1976
 Member, ILEA Education Committee, 1970-1977
 Chairman, World Development Political Action Trust, 1971-1975
 Alderman, Royal Borough of Kensington and Chelsea, 1971-1977
 Chairman, Mauritius Salaries Commission, 1973-1977
 Member, Court of Governors, London School of Economics, 1973-1978
 South Metropolitan Conciliation Committee, Race Relations Board, 1975-1977
 Warden, Toynbee Hall, 1977-1987
 Vice-Chairman, Toynbee Housing Association, 1977-1986
 Governor, Tower Hamlets Adult Education Institute, 1978-1991
 Governor, City and East London College, 1978-1991
 Chairman, Mauritius Government Enquiry into position of families without wage earners, 1981
 Government Salaries Commissioner, Mauritius, 1987-1988
 Chairman, Tower Hamlets ILEA Tertiary Education Council, and Member Tertiary Education Board, 1987-1991
 Chairman, Spitalfields Heritage Centre, 1987-1991

References 

1923 births
1991 deaths
Members of London County Council
Members of the Order of the British Empire
Labour Party (UK) councillors